Pebley is a surname. Notable people with the surname include:

Jacob Pebley (born 1993), American backstroke swimmer
Raegan Pebley (born 1975), American basketball coach and former player

See also
Penley (surname)